Conway notation may refer to the following notations created by John Horton Conway:

 Conway chained arrow notation
 Conway notation (knot theory)
 Conway polyhedron notation
 Conway triangle notation
 Orbifold notation